Marsden was a former parliamentary electorate, in the Whangarei District and in the Northland Region of New Zealand, which existed from 1858 to 1972. Upon its abolition, Marsden was replaced with the Whangarei electorate.

Population centres
The initial 24 New Zealand electorates were defined by Governor George Grey in March 1853, based on the New Zealand Constitution Act 1852 that had been passed by the British government. The Constitution Act also allowed the House of Representatives to establish new electorates, and this was first done in 1858, when four new electorates were formed by splitting existing electorates. Marsden was one of those four electorates, and it covered the northern area split off from the  electorate.

The electorate was mixed urban and rural, around the city of Whangarei.

History
The electorate existed from 1858 to 1972, and the first election was held on 29 November 1859, which was during the term of the 2nd Parliament. James Farmer was the first representative. The second representative was John Munro, who was elected on 27 December 1860, and served the whole term of the 3rd Parliament.

Francis Hull was elected to the 4th Parliament, resigned in 1869 and was succeeded by Munro in the February by-election. Munro served the rest of the term, plus the term of the 5th Parliament.

All subsequent representatives have always served full terms.

In the  there was some doubt about the validity of the election result, and a law was passed to confirm the result in Marsden and two other electorates.

The  was contested by Robert Thompson and Joseph Dargaville, and they received 955 and 550 votes, respectively. Thompson was thus declared elected.

Thompson acquired the labels 'Marsden Thompson' and 'the member for roads and bridges' in Parliament. He was known for his devotion to the interests of his district, which was desperately in need of good roads, and his only reason for being a Liberal was that the government was the only source of funding for roads and bridges (as with many other Liberals representing country electorates). He was pro-freehold (land), and was opposed to Liberal policies such as labour legislation and old age pensions. In , when he stood unsuccessfully for Auckland West against a sitting Liberal member, he was once more an Independent, and his programme – freehold (land), acquisition of Maori land and opposition to prohibition had not altered.

Members of Parliament
Key:

Election results

1969 election

1966 election

1963 election

1960 election

1957 election

1954 election

1951 election

1949 election

1946 election

1943 election

 
 
 
 
 

 

Table footnotes:

1938 election

1935 election

1931 election

1928 election

1925 election

1922 election

1919 election

1899 election

1890 election

Notes

References

Historical electorates of New Zealand
Whangarei District
1858 establishments in New Zealand
1972 disestablishments in New Zealand